José Concepción Pinto Castro (1829–1898) was a Costa Rican politician.

His parents were General Antonio Pinto Soares and María del Rosario Castro y Ramírez. He married Aurelia Montealegre Fernández, daughter of Mariano Montealegre Bustamante, in 1859. His brother José Antonio Pinto Castro was President of the Supreme Court.

He graduated in law from Universidad de San Carlos de Guatemala and served as secretary to President Rafael Carrera of Guatemala.

He was Magistrate and Prosecutor for the Supreme Court of Justice of Costa Rica, Governor of San José Province in 1859 and 1870, supply member for San José in the Constituents Assembly from 1869 and Chief of the National Seal.

He actively participated in charitable activities. He was one of the founding members of the Brotherhood of Charity of San José and presided over the Board of Charity of San José.

1829 births
1898 deaths
19th-century Costa Rican judges
Universidad de San Carlos de Guatemala alumni
Costa Rican people of Portuguese descent
Members of the Legislative Assembly of Costa Rica
Supreme Court of Justice of Costa Rica judges